Michael Cox (born August 2, 1992) is a Canadian soccer player who last played as a forward for York9 in the Canadian Premier League.

Career

FC Edmonton 
Cox turned professional in 2010 as a 17-year-old when he signed with FC Edmonton. He played for Edmonton during its 2010 exhibition season, scoring Edmonton's first-ever goal in an exhibition win over Montreal Impact and continued his contract when the team formally joined the North American Soccer League in 2011. He made his professional debut on May 23, 2011 in a 2–1 win over the NSC Minnesota Stars, and scored his first two goals in a 3–0 win against the Atlanta Silverbacks on August 21, 2011. The club re-signed Cox for the 2012 season on October 12, 2011.

KuPS 

He turned down a contract from the Eddies ahead of their 2014 campaign and subsequently signed for KuPS. He made his debut for the team on June 10, 2014. After spending time in Finland, he had trailed and signed with Portuguese Segunda Liga squad Atlético CP.

York University 

In 2015, Michael Cox lead the York Lions to the Sam Davidson Memorial Trophy which gave the program their fifth national CIS championship. Michael Cox scored four goals in the final tournament and was named tournament MVP and tournament all-star. "It feels great to win a national title in my first year as a Lion," said Cox. "We created a legacy here today that we can build off of in the years to come." In 16 CIS games, Michael Cox scored a goal a game, had 4 game winners and 87 shots on net. He was awarded with OUA athlete of the week, CIS athlete of the week, OUA first team all-star nomination.

Orlando City B 

Cox signed with United Soccer League side Orlando City B on January 13, 2016. In his preseason game against the University of Central Florida, he was able to score record a hat-trick in just 35 minutes of action. On April 9, Cox scored his first goal for Orlando City B 4 minutes into his first game with the club. Cox would lead Orlando City B in scoring and would finish 8th in the USL with 11 goals in the 2016 USL season. In November 2016, Orlando City B announced that they had re-signed Cox for the 2017 season. At the conclusion of the 2017 season, Orlando City B announced they would not pick up Cox' option for the following season.

Nashville SC 

On December 7, 2017, Cox signed with new USL side Nashville SC ahead of their inaugural season.

York9 
On February 1, 2019 Cox signed with Canadian Premier League club York 9.

References

External links
 Edmonton profile

1992 births
Living people
Association football forwards
Canadian soccer players
Soccer players from Calgary
Black Canadian soccer players
Canadian expatriate soccer players
Expatriate footballers in Finland
Canadian expatriate sportspeople in Finland
Expatriate soccer players in the United States
Canadian expatriate sportspeople in the United States
FC Edmonton players
SC Kuopio Futis-98 players
Kuopion Palloseura players
Orlando City B players
Nashville SC (2018–19) players
Saint Louis FC players
York United FC players
North American Soccer League players
Kakkonen players
Veikkausliiga players
USL Championship players
Canadian Premier League players